Hans Emil Boje Jensen (28 August 1911 – 16 August 1964) was a Danish rower. He competed at the 1936 Summer Olympics in Berlin with the men's eight where they came sixth.

References

1911 births
1964 deaths
Danish male rowers
Olympic rowers of Denmark
Rowers at the 1936 Summer Olympics
People from Sorø Municipality
European Rowing Championships medalists
Sportspeople from Region Zealand